Urakawa Station is the name of two train stations in Japan:

 Urakawa Station (Hokkaido) (浦河駅)
 Urakawa Station (Shizuoka) (浦川駅)